Betesfa Getahun (born 25 September 1998) is an Ethiopian long-distance runner. In 2018, he competed in the men's half marathon at the 2018 IAAF World Half Marathon Championships held in Valencia, Spain. He finished in 6th place.

In 2017, he competed in the junior men's race at the 2017 IAAF World Cross Country Championships held in Kampala, Uganda.

In 2018, he competed in his first half marathons, in 2019 in the first marathon.

Personal bests

References

External links 
 

Living people
1998 births
Place of birth missing (living people)
Ethiopian male long-distance runners
Ethiopian male cross country runners
21st-century Ethiopian people